N-Peace, or ‘Engage for Equality, Access, Community and Empowerment’ is a UNDP flagship initiative founded in 2010 to commemorate a decade of UNSCR 1325 implementation via the Women, Peace and Security (WPS) agenda.

Currently unique to the Asia-Pacific region, N-Peace operates in Afghanistan, Pakistan, Myanmar, Sri Lanka, Indonesia, the Philippines, and Nepal with the goal of increasing the role of women in conflict resolution and peace-building. N-Peace is built on the premise that if targeted women, men, and civil society organisations are supported with increased investments in capacity, skills, and resources, they will be able to create institutional and social shifts that prioritise the inclusion and empowerment of women and girls, and ultimately change the discourse on the roles of women in peace-building.

Many interventions aimed at facilitating WPS have approached women's inclusion through top-down tactics: influencing policy and lawmakers, empowering women to realize their economic potential, and introducing quotas for women's participation in peace agreements and political institutions. However, these approaches arguably do not always address the underlying structural causes of gender inequality. Furthermore, considering peace a top-level political or military process falls short of addressing the broader, nuanced issues faced by ordinary people affected by conflict in society. The annual N-Peace Awards, therefore, serve to shine a much-needed spotlight on grassroots gender equality advocates and women peacebuilders in the region.

N-Peace ultimately serves four primary goals: first, to conduct dialogues among communities, governments and other groups related to WPS; second, to build the capacity of women peace activists working on the ground; third, to expand and strengthen the network of peace-building activists to best implement UNSCR 1325; and finally, to support women's participation in peace and security through sharing their stories.

List of award winners

Peace awards
Awards established in 2010